The Cincinnati Riverhawks were a professional soccer team that debuted in the USISL Premier Development League in 1997 and joined the A-League from 1998 to 2003. They played their games at Galbreath Field in Kings Mills, Ohio and later at the Hamilton County Fairgrounds and at the Town and Country Sports Complex in Wilder, KY. The Riverhawks were disbanded following the 2003 season.

History

The Cincinnati Riverhawks were a professional soccer team from Cincinnati, Ohio, owned by the Cincinnati Soccer Club. The team initially played in the USISL Premier Development League Mid-South Division in 1997. The team finished the 1997 season in first place in its division, winning ten and losing five matches. The team advanced to the second round of the playoffs, before losing to its division rival, the Jackson Chargers.
In 1998, the Riverhawks joined the A-League's Central Division. The squad finished in fifth place in its division, with eleven wins and seventeen losses. Before the start of the 1999 season, the United Systems of Independent Soccer Leagues (USISL) became the United Soccer Leagues (USL).

The Riverhawks remained in the organization's A-League, Central Division, finishing last in its division, with a record of seven losses and twenty-one ties. The next season the Riverhawks again finished last in the Central Division, with a record of two wins, twenty-three losses, and three ties. The team continued its poor showing in the 2001 season, finishing last in its division, while winning just six and losing twenty matches. In the 2002 season, the Riverhawks finished in third place in its division, one place ahead of last place. The team won eight and lost twenty matches. The Riverhawks repeated its performance of remaining out of last place by a single spot during the 2003 season. Still, after repeated disappointing performances, the Cincinnati Riverhawks disbanded following the 2003 season.

Colors & Badge

The Riverhawks debuted with their original logo and primary colors (white, royal blue, gold) in the 1997 season but would later change their logo for the 2001 and 2002 seasons.

Year-by-year

Coaches
 Nick Ranieri (1997)

See also
Cincinnati Ladyhawks
FC Cincinnati

References

R
Defunct soccer clubs in Ohio
A-League (1995–2004) teams
USISL teams
Soccer clubs in Ohio
1997 establishments in Ohio
2003 disestablishments in Ohio
Association football clubs established in 1997
Association football clubs disestablished in 2003